The Beryozovsky constituency (No.170) is a Russian legislative constituency in Sverdlovsk Oblast. Until 2007 the constituency was based entirely in Yekaterinburg, however, after 2015 redistricting the constituency was stretched to central Sverdlovsk Oblast.

Members elected

Election results

1993

|-
! colspan=2 style="background-color:#E9E9E9;text-align:left;vertical-align:top;" |Candidate
! style="background-color:#E9E9E9;text-align:left;vertical-align:top;" |Party
! style="background-color:#E9E9E9;text-align:right;" |Votes
! style="background-color:#E9E9E9;text-align:right;" |%
|-
|style="background-color:"|
|align=left|Yury Brusnitsyn
|align=left|Independent
|
|16.78%
|-
|style="background-color:"|
|align=left|Vladimir Isakov
|align=left|Independent
| -
|14.94%
|-
| colspan="5" style="background-color:#E9E9E9;"|
|- style="font-weight:bold"
| colspan="3" style="text-align:left;" | Total
| 
| 100%
|-
| colspan="5" style="background-color:#E9E9E9;"|
|- style="font-weight:bold"
| colspan="4" |Source:
|
|}

1995 by-election
After Yury Brusnitsyn resigned to take a job in the State Duma Apparatus a by-election in Ordzhonikidzevsky constituency was scheduled for May 1995. The results of the by-election were annulled due to low turnout (10%).

1995

|-
! colspan=2 style="background-color:#E9E9E9;text-align:left;vertical-align:top;" |Candidate
! style="background-color:#E9E9E9;text-align:left;vertical-align:top;" |Party
! style="background-color:#E9E9E9;text-align:right;" |Votes
! style="background-color:#E9E9E9;text-align:right;" |%
|-
|style="background-color:"|
|align=left|Galina Karelova
|align=left|Independent
|
|25.01%
|-
|style="background-color:"|
|align=left|Artyom Bikov
|align=left|Independent
|
|11.22%
|-
|style="background-color:#3A46CE"|
|align=left|Anatoly Grebyonkin
|align=left|Democratic Choice of Russia – United Democrats
|
|10.12%
|-
|style="background-color:"|
|align=left|Aleksandr Ponomarev
|align=left|Our Home – Russia
|
|9.91%
|-
|style="background-color:#265BAB"|
|align=left|Georgy Stepanenko
|align=left|Russian Lawyers' Association
|
|4.56%
|-
|style="background-color:#D50000"|
|align=left|Nyazip Sarvarov
|align=left|Communists and Working Russia - for the Soviet Union
|
|4.55%
|-
|style="background-color:#DA2021"|
|align=left|Yakov Ryabov
|align=left|Ivan Rybkin Bloc
|
|3.22%
|-
|style="background-color:"|
|align=left|Valery Bulatov
|align=left|Liberal Democratic Party
|
|3.02%
|-
|style="background-color:#1C1A0D"|
|align=left|Aleksandr Shlyapin
|align=left|Forward, Russia!
|
|3.00%
|-
|style="background-color:#00A200"|
|align=left|Aleksandr Sivkov
|align=left|Transformation of the Fatherland
|
|2.20%
|-
|style="background-color:#1A1A1A"|
|align=left|Nafik Famiyev
|align=left|Stanislav Govorukhin Bloc
|
|2.05%
|-
|style="background-color:"|
|align=left|Leonid Khabarov
|align=left|Independent
|
|1.78%
|-
|style="background-color:"|
|align=left|Yury Andreyev
|align=left|Independent
|
|1.23%
|-
|style="background-color:"|
|align=left|Oleg Lekhov
|align=left|Independent
|
|0.78%
|-
|style="background-color:"|
|align=left|Aleksandr Aulov
|align=left|Independent
|
|0.53%
|-
|style="background-color:"|
|align=left|Rudolf Sventsitsky
|align=left|Independent
|
|0.52%
|-
|style="background-color:"|
|align=left|Anatoly Saulyak
|align=left|Independent
|
|0.40%
|-
|style="background-color:#000000"|
|colspan=2 |against all
|
|12.84%
|-
| colspan="5" style="background-color:#E9E9E9;"|
|- style="font-weight:bold"
| colspan="3" style="text-align:left;" | Total
| 
| 100%
|-
| colspan="5" style="background-color:#E9E9E9;"|
|- style="font-weight:bold"
| colspan="4" |Source:
|
|}

1997
After Galina Karelova was appointed Deputy Minister of Labour and Social Protection in May 1997 a by-election in Ordzhonikidzevsky constituency was scheduled for 23 November 1997. Aleksandr Khabarov received the most votes in the by-election, however, the results were annulled due to low turnout (21%).

1998

|-
! colspan=2 style="background-color:#E9E9E9;text-align:left;vertical-align:top;" |Candidate
! style="background-color:#E9E9E9;text-align:left;vertical-align:top;" |Party
! style="background-color:#E9E9E9;text-align:right;" |Votes
! style="background-color:#E9E9E9;text-align:right;" |%
|-
|style="background-color:"|
|align=left|Dmitry Golovanov
|align=left|Independent
|
|26.55%
|-
|style="background-color:"|
|align=left|Valery Terletsky
|align=left|Independent
|
|24.62%
|-
|style="background-color:#000000"|
|colspan=2 |against all
|
|40.28%
|-
| colspan="5" style="background-color:#E9E9E9;"|
|- style="font-weight:bold"
| colspan="3" style="text-align:left;" | Total
| 
| 100%
|-
| colspan="5" style="background-color:#E9E9E9;"|
|- style="font-weight:bold"
| colspan="4" |Source:
|
|}

1999
A by-election was scheduled after Against all line received the most votes.

|-
! colspan=2 style="background-color:#E9E9E9;text-align:left;vertical-align:top;" |Candidate
! style="background-color:#E9E9E9;text-align:left;vertical-align:top;" |Party
! style="background-color:#E9E9E9;text-align:right;" |Votes
! style="background-color:#E9E9E9;text-align:right;" |%
|-
|style="background-color:#E98282"|
|align=left|Nadezhda Golubkova
|align=left|Women of Russia
|
|20.80%
|-
|style="background-color:"|
|align=left|Aleksandr Khabarov
|align=left|Independent
|
|20.71%
|-
|style="background-color:"|
|align=left|Vladimir Isakov
|align=left|Independent
|
|13.38%
|-
|style="background-color:#1042A5"|
|align=left|Vladimir Popov
|align=left|Union of Right Forces
|
|7.26%
|-
|style="background-color:#084284"|
|align=left|Vladimir Karzhavin
|align=left|Spiritual Heritage
|
|3.23%
|-
|style="background-color:#FF4400"|
|align=left|Eduard Markin
|align=left|Andrey Nikolayev and Svyatoslav Fyodorov Bloc
|
|2.09%
|-
|style="background-color:"|
|align=left|Olga Korostelyova
|align=left|Independent
|
|1.81%
|-
|style="background-color:#E2CA66"|
|align=left|Sergey Kozyrev
|align=left|For Civil Dignity
|
|1.10%
|-
|style="background-color:"|
|align=left|Aleksandr Melkov
|align=left|Independent
|
|0.67%
|-
|style="background-color:"|
|align=left|Pavel Masharakin
|align=left|Independent
|
|0.28%
|-
|style="background-color:#000000"|
|colspan=2 |against all
|
|25.57%
|-
| colspan="5" style="background-color:#E9E9E9;"|
|- style="font-weight:bold"
| colspan="3" style="text-align:left;" | Total
| 
| 100%
|-
| colspan="5" style="background-color:#E9E9E9;"|
|- style="font-weight:bold"
| colspan="4" |Source:
|
|}

2000

|-
! colspan=2 style="background-color:#E9E9E9;text-align:left;vertical-align:top;" |Candidate
! style="background-color:#E9E9E9;text-align:left;vertical-align:top;" |Party
! style="background-color:#E9E9E9;text-align:right;" |Votes
! style="background-color:#E9E9E9;text-align:right;" |%
|-
|style="background-color:"|
|align=left|Nikolay Ovchinnikov
|align=left|Independent
|
|21.81%
|-
|style="background-color:"|
|align=left|Aleksandr Khabarov
|align=left|Independent
|
|18.07%
|-
|style="background-color:"|
|align=left|Nadezhda Golubkova
|align=left|Independent
|
|17.60%
|-
|style="background-color:"|
|align=left|Albert Makashov
|align=left|Independent
|
|10.56%
|-
|style="background-color:"|
|align=left|Rimma Varnavskaya
|align=left|Independent
|
|7.13%
|-
|style="background-color:"|
|align=left|Vladimir Ovchinnikov
|align=left|Independent
|
|5.01%
|-
|style="background-color:"|
|align=left|Vladimir Popov
|align=left|Independent
|
|2.61%
|-
|style="background-color:#000000"|
|colspan=2 |against all
|
|14.10%
|-
| colspan="5" style="background-color:#E9E9E9;"|
|- style="font-weight:bold"
| colspan="3" style="text-align:left;" | Total
| 
| 100%
|-
| colspan="5" style="background-color:#E9E9E9;"|
|- style="font-weight:bold"
| colspan="4" |Source:
|
|}

2003

|-
! colspan=2 style="background-color:#E9E9E9;text-align:left;vertical-align:top;" |Candidate
! style="background-color:#E9E9E9;text-align:left;vertical-align:top;" |Party
! style="background-color:#E9E9E9;text-align:right;" |Votes
! style="background-color:#E9E9E9;text-align:right;" |%
|-
|style="background-color:"|
|align=left|Yevgeny Roizman
|align=left|Independent
|
|39.99%
|-
|style="background-color:"|
|align=left|Nadezhda Golubkova
|align=left|United Russia
|
|11.73%
|-
|style="background-color:"|
|align=left|Vasily Rudenko
|align=left|Independent
|
|8.39%
|-
|style="background-color:#FFD700"|
|align=left|Sergey Cherkasov
|align=left|People's Party
|
|7.08%
|-
|style="background-color:"|
|align=left|Andrey Alshevskikh
|align=left|Independent
|
|5.76%
|-
|style="background-color:"|
|align=left|Valery Yablonskikh
|align=left|Communist Party
|
|3.66%
|-
|style="background-color:#7C73CC"|
|align=left|Olga Kharitonova
|align=left|Great Russia – Eurasian Union
|
|3.40%
|-
|style="background-color:"|
|align=left|Grigory Sapozhnikov
|align=left|Liberal Democratic Party
|
|1.95%
|-
|style="background-color:#000000"|
|colspan=2 |against all
|
|15.28%
|-
| colspan="5" style="background-color:#E9E9E9;"|
|- style="font-weight:bold"
| colspan="3" style="text-align:left;" | Total
| 
| 100%
|-
| colspan="5" style="background-color:#E9E9E9;"|
|- style="font-weight:bold"
| colspan="4" |Source:
|
|}

2016

|-
! colspan=2 style="background-color:#E9E9E9;text-align:left;vertical-align:top;" |Candidate
! style="background-color:#E9E9E9;text-align:leftt;vertical-align:top;" |Party
! style="background-color:#E9E9E9;text-align:right;" |Votes
! style="background-color:#E9E9E9;text-align:right;" |%
|-
| style="background-color: " |
|align=left|Sergey Chepikov
|align=left|United Russia
|
|43.64%
|-
| style="background-color: " |
|align=left|Dmitry Ionin
|align=left|A Just Russia
|
|15.22%
|-
|style="background-color:"|
|align=left|Yevgeny Borovik
|align=left|Communist Party
|
|12.65%
|-
|style="background-color:"|
|align=left|Pavel Davletshin
|align=left|Liberal Democratic Party
|
|8.73%
|-
|style="background-color: " |
|align=left|Valery Molokov
|align=left|Party of Growth
|
|3.68%
|-
|style="background-color:"|
|align=left|Mikhail Borisov
|align=left|People's Freedom Party
|
|3.46%
|-
|style="background-color: " |
|align=left|Igor Ruzakov
|align=left|The Greens
|
|2.83%
|-
|style="background-color: " |
|align=left|Ruslan Khasanzyanov
|align=left|Communists of Russia
|
|2.12%
|-
|style="background-color: " |
|align=left|Daniil Voronov
|align=left|Patriots of Russia
|
|1.57%
|-
| colspan="5" style="background-color:#E9E9E9;"|
|- style="font-weight:bold"
| colspan="3" style="text-align:left;" | Total
| 
| 100%
|-
| colspan="5" style="background-color:#E9E9E9;"|
|- style="font-weight:bold"
| colspan="4" |Source:
|
|}

2021

|-
! colspan=2 style="background-color:#E9E9E9;text-align:left;vertical-align:top;" |Candidate
! style="background-color:#E9E9E9;text-align:left;vertical-align:top;" |Party
! style="background-color:#E9E9E9;text-align:right;" |Votes
! style="background-color:#E9E9E9;text-align:right;" |%
|-
|style="background-color: " |
|align=left|Sergey Chepikov (incumbent)
|align=left|United Russia
|
|33.97%
|-
|style="background-color:"|
|align=left|Aleksey Parfenov
|align=left|Communist Party
|
|20.88%
|-
|style="background-color:"|
|align=left|Irina Vinogradova
|align=left|New People
|
|11.01%
|-
|style="background-color: "|
|align=left|Vladimir Vorozhtsov
|align=left|Party of Pensioners
|
|7.17%
|-
|style="background-color:"|
|align=left|Kirill Nekrasov
|align=left|Liberal Democratic Party
|
|6.45%
|-
|style="background-color: "|
|align=left|Roman Zykov
|align=left|Russian Party of Freedom and Justice
|
|6.05%
|-
|style="background-color: " |
|align=left|Albert Khusnutdinov
|align=left|Yabloko
|
|3.36%
|-
|style="background-color: " |
|align=left|Sergey Kapchuk
|align=left|Party of Growth
|
|2.61%
|-
|style="background-color:"|
|align=left|Yaroslav Podshivalov
|align=left|Rodina
|
|2.05%
|-
| colspan="5" style="background-color:#E9E9E9;"|
|- style="font-weight:bold"
| colspan="3" style="text-align:left;" | Total
| 
| 100%
|-
| colspan="5" style="background-color:#E9E9E9;"|
|- style="font-weight:bold"
| colspan="4" |Source:
|
|}

Notes

References

Russian legislative constituencies
Politics of Sverdlovsk Oblast